Məzrəli (known as Yuxarı Hacıqasımlı until 2000) is a village and municipality in the Saatly Rayon of Azerbaijan.  It has a population of 972.

References 

Populated places in Saatly District